Catherine The Great is a 2015 Russian television series starring Yuliya Snigir as Catherine the Great. It was released in November 2015 on Channel One Russia.

Plot
The history of Catherine the Great from the moment she arrived in Russia as the new bride of Peter III and her ascent to the Russian throne.

Nearly 20 years of palace intrigues, conspiracies, the struggle for power and personal dramas.

Cast

Production

Filming
Filming was completed from December 2013 to August 2014 in Saint Petersburg and Leningrad Oblast (including Peter and Paul Fortress, Constantine Palace, Gatchina, and Lenfilm Studios).

The crew is working on scenarios of the second and third season. They will tell the life of the Empress from 1762 to 1775 and from 1775 to 1796, respectively. The second season was expected to finish filming in 2016. Note: the preceding information is now outdated and inaccurate. 

Information on the show during the making of the 2nd and 3rd seasons can be seen on the wayback machine.

Both the Second and Third seasons have been released. Season 2 involves Ekaterina, her sons, her relationship with the eldest Orlov brother, and Count Panin. Season 3 expands on some of second seasons’s storylines, while focusing on two of history’s better-known Pretenders who claimed the Russian throne rightfully belonged to them.

See also
 Ekaterina, Russia-1's 2014 version

References

External links
Official Website
Official Trailer on YouTube
 

2015 television films
2010s Russian television series
2015 Russian television series debuts
2015 Russian television series endings
Serial drama television series
Television series set in the 18th century
Historical television series
Russian political television series
Television series based on actual events
Russian television miniseries
Russian drama television series
Depictions of Catherine the Great on television
Television shows set in Saint Petersburg
Channel One Russia original programming
Biographical films about Russian royalty
Russian biographical television series